The cantons of Laval are administrative divisions of the Mayenne department, in northwestern France. Since the French canton reorganisation which came into effect in March 2015, the city of Laval is subdivided into 3 cantons. Their seat is in Laval.

Population

References

Cantons of Mayenne